Land Tawney is the President/CEO of Backcountry Hunters & Anglers, a national conservation group based in Montana.

Background

Tawney was raised in Montana, where he hunted and fished from an early age. He earned a bachelor's degree in wildlife biology from the University of Montana in 2000. Prior to working at Backcountry Hunters & Anglers, Tawney worked for other conservation organizations including the National Wildlife Federation and the Theodore Roosevelt Conservation Partnership. He resides in Missoula, Montana.

Tawney testified before the US House of Representatives in 2020 in support of the Boundary Waters Canoe Area Wilderness.Tawney has supported additional conservation efforts on public lands.

Work at Backcountry Hunters & Anglers

As President/CEO of Backcountry Hunters & Anglers, Tawney has expanded the organization to include chapters in 48 states across United States and chapters in Alberta, British Columbia, and Yukon Territory in  Canada. Tawney leads rallies to keep federal lands open to the public.

Political Activism

In 2008, Tawney was a leader of the Sportsmen for Obama Committee.

Tawney served on Democratic Senator Jon Tester's sportsmen advisory panel.  Tawney was also the President of the Montana Hunters and Anglers Action political action committee.

References

University of Montana alumni
Living people
Year of birth missing (living people)